The 2019 European Women Basketball Championship, commonly called EuroBasket Women 2019, was the 37th edition of the continental tournament in women's basketball, sanctioned by the FIBA Europe. The tournament was co-held in Latvia and Serbia from 27 June to 7 July 2019.

Spain won their second consecutive and fourth overall title after defeating France 86–66 in the final.

Venues

Qualification

Qualified teams

Draw
The final draw took place on 12 December 2018 in Belgrade, Serbia. The mascots Pick and Roll made their first appearance in the draw.

Seedings
The official seedings for the FIBA Women's EuroBasket 2019 Draw were established on 10 December 2018.

Co-Hosts Latvia and Serbia were each allowed to select one other team to play in the opposite group they were hosting but not playing in. Latvia chose Sweden to play in Group A, while Serbia selected Slovenia, who will play in Group D.

Squads

All rosters consist of 12 players.

First round
The schedule was confirmed on 13 February 2019.

Group A

Group B

Group C

Group D

Final round

Final

Final ranking

Statistics and awards

Statistical leaders

Points

Rebounds

Assists

Blocks

Steals

Awards
The all star-teams and MVP was announced on 7 July 2019.

References

External links
Official website
Official website (Qualifiers)

 
2019
EuroBasket Women
EuroBasket Women 2019
EuroBasket Women 2019
EuroBasket Women
EuroBasket Women
June 2019 sports events in Europe
2018–19 in Serbian basketball
2018–19 in Latvian basketball
2010s in Belgrade
2010s in Riga
Sport in Zrenjanin
Sport in Niš
Sports competitions in Riga
International sports competitions in Belgrade
July 2019 sports events in Europe
Basketball in Belgrade